Nao Hibino and Alicja Rosolska were the defending champions, but Rosolska chose to compete in Charleston instead. Hibino played alongside Darija Jurak, but lost in the quarterfinals to Valeria Savinykh and Yana Sizikova.

Naomi Broady and Sara Sorribes Tormo won the title, defeating Desirae Krawczyk and Giuliana Olmos in the final, 3–6, 6–4, [10–8].

Seeds

Draw

Draw

References
 

Monterrey Open - Doubles
2018 Doubles